The Chapel of Our Lady of Deliverance is a Catholic church located in the city of Igarassu, Pernambuco, Brazil. The church dates to 1774 and is part of the historic center of the city. The church is dedicated to Saints Cosmas and Damian and belongs to the Roman Catholic Archdiocese of Olinda and Recife. The church was listed as a historic structure by the National Historic and Artistic Heritage Institute in 1951.

History

The chapel was completed in 1774. It was built on land belonging to the municipality of Igarassu. It was completed eight years later. Joaquim Rodrigues da Costa Queimado, a local judge, ordered the formation of a brotherhood, the Irmandade de Nossa Senhora do Livramento dos Homens Pardos, a brotherhood of mixed-race citizens, to maintain the church. The church was heavily damaged by wind and rain in 1958. A portion of the ceiling structure collapsed; the chapel was subsequently restored between 1972 and 1984.

Structure

The Chapel of Our Lady of Deliverance has an ornated baroque-style façade with a single portal at ground level. There are two windows at the choir level, both with wooden balusters. A niche sits between the windows at choir level. The chapel has a heavy, ornate pediment with volutes, an oculus at center, and pinnacles at both sides. The pediment is surmounted by a cross. The bell tower is located in the body of the church itself and not visible from the façade.

See also

 Church and Convent of Saint Antony
 Church of São Cosme e São Damião

References

Roman Catholic churches in Brazil
Portuguese colonial architecture in Brazil
Roman Catholic churches completed in 1774
National heritage sites of Pernambuco